Sanchai Ratiwatana and Sonchat Ratiwatana were the defending champions, but lost in the first round to Jamie Delgado and Gilles Müller.

Rameez Junaid and Michael Venus won the title, defeating Ruben Bemelmans and Go Soeda in the final, 4–6, 7–6(7–1), [10–6].

Seeds

Draw

Draw

References
 Main Draw

2014 Men's Doubles
Nottingham Challenge - Doubles